There are, or have been, several studios in the city of Birmingham, England that could be described as Birmingham Studios.

Television

BBC
 Pebble Mill Studios in Edgbaston Location of BBC Birmingham and BBC West Midlands from 1971 and 2004.
 The Mailbox Location of BBC Birmingham and BBC West Midlands since 2004.
 BBC Drama Village in Selly Oak BBC Drama Studios.

ITV
 Alpha Studios, shared by ATV Midlands and ABC Weekend TV from 1956 to 1970.
 Central House, previously ATV Centre, used by ATV and later Central from 1970 to 1997.
 Gas Street Studios, used by Central (Now ITV Central) since 1997, also used by CITV between 1998 and 2004.

Radio
 The Mailbox, BBC WM and BBC Asian Network.
 Nine Brindleyplace, Free Radio Birmingham and Free Radio Coventry & Warwickshire
 One The Square, Capital Birmingham and Heart West Midlands